SCORE may refer to:
SCORE (software), a music scorewriter program
SCORE (television), a weekend sports service of the defunct Financial News Network
SCORE! Educational Centers
SCORE International, an offroad racing organization
Sarawak Corridor of Renewable Energy, a regional development corridor in Malaysia
Singapore Corporation of Rehabilitative Enterprises, the former name of Yellow Ribbon Singapore, a statutory board under the Ministry of Home Affairs
Project SCORE, a communications satellite

See also
Score (disambiguation)
The Score (disambiguation)
Scores (disambiguation)